Matiabag Rajbari or Matiabag Palace is in Gauripur in Dhubri district of Assam. The palace is located at Matiabag hill near the  bank of the Godadhar river. As it is located near Matiabag hill, it is named as Matiabag Rajbari. It was used as Hawakhana by the Royal family of Gauripur. It was used as residence by famous pre-independence era actor and director (Devdas movie famed) late Pramathesh Chandra Barua.

History
As per people's belief, once Raja  Pratap Chandra Barua (the then ruler of Gauripur) was hunting in the forest and saw a frog which was eating a snake. He was surprised to see this unnatural thing. Being a very strong devotee of Goddess Mahamaya, he believed that it was a message for him from Mahamaya. Afterward, he constructed a temple for Goddess Mahamaya and named the place as Gauripur after the alias "Gauri" of Mahamaya.

Transportation
Driving distance from Dhubri to Gauripur is 9 km and from Guwahati to Gauripur is 261 km. The nearest railway station is at Dhubri. Well-connected airports are at Guwahati (261 km) and Bagdogra (226 km).

References

Monuments and memorials in Assam
Tourist attractions in Assam
Forts in Assam
Royal residences in India
Palaces in Assam
Dhubri